Fernando Fiore (born July 9, 1960) is an Argentine television personality known as the co-creator and original host of Lente Loco from 1992 to 1993, and the host of the travel show Fuera de Serie with Sofía Vergara. He is perhaps best known as the host of Republica Deportiva from its debut in 1999 until his departure in 2014. Fiore has anchored Univision's FIFA World Cup coverage from 1990 until 2014. Fiore, a two-time Emmy Award winner, is also the author of The World Cup: The Ultimate Guide to the Greatest Sports Spectacle in the World. As of 2015, Fiore works as a Bundesliga commentator and a Germany correspondent for Fox Deportes in the United States and Puerto Rico and Fox Sports in Latin America, as well as an English-language studio host for Fox Sports's soccer coverage.

Early life
Fiore was born in Buenos Aires, Argentina. He had a number of jobs, including manual laborer, chauffeur, stage actor, and tour guide. At the age of 19, he moved to the United States to study communications at Montclair State University. During this time, he also worked as a tour guide before he later turned to acting.

Career

Early television career
In 1988, Fiore moved to Miami, Florida, where he worked as a reporter for the news magazine program Día a Día. He moved to New York City the following year and started working as a news anchor for its local Univision station, including coverage of the FIFA World Cup in 1990. Fiore later moved back to Miami and did sports coverage for the Univision network. In 1992, he created and hosted the hidden-camera prank show Lente Loco. Cuban model Odalys Garcia joined the show as co-host later in its first season. By 1993, Fiore left Lente Loco to work on other projects at Univision and was replaced by George Ortuzar. From 1995 to 1998, Fiore hosted the travel series Fuera de Serie alongside Sofia Vergara.

Broadcasting career
Fiore was a long-time Univision personality, having formerly hosted its sports show Republica Deportiva. In 2015, Fiore joined Fox Sports, primarily serving as an on-air host for the division's Spanish-language network Fox Deportes. Fiore has also appeared as a panellist for Fox's English-language soccer coverage, including the CONCACAF Cup and Copa America Centenario.

During the 2018 FIFA World Cup in Russia, Fiore hosted FIFA World Cup Tonight along with Kate Abdo.

References

External links
 
 
 

Association football commentators
Living people
1960 births
Montclair State University alumni